Heart of Stone is an upcoming American spy action thriller film directed by Tom Harper from a screenplay by Greg Rucka and Allison Schroeder and a story by Rucka. The film stars Gal Gadot, Jamie Dornan, and Alia Bhatt.

The development of Heart of Stone began in December 2020, when Gadot signed on to star, with the film being the planned start of a franchise in a similar vein to the Mission: Impossible films. Harper and Netflix were confirmed to serve as director and distributor respectively the following month, with the rest of the cast being confirmed in early 2022. Filming took place in Italy, London, Reykjavík and Lisbon between January and July. The film is scheduled to be released on August 11, 2023, by Netflix.

Premise
Rachel Stone is a CIA agent, the only woman who stands between her powerful, global, peace-keeping organization and the loss of its most valuable — and dangerous — asset.

Cast
 Gal Gadot as Rachel Stone
 Jamie Dornan as Parker
 Alia Bhatt as Keya Dhawan
 Sophie Okonedo
 Matthias Schweighöfer
 Jing Lusi
 Paul Ready
 Jon Kortajarena
 Archie Madekwe
 Matteo Cicconi
 Angela Esposito
 Daniela T. Nikolova

Production
It was announced in December 2020 that Gal Gadot had signed on to star in the film, which is planned to be the beginning of a franchise in a similar vein to the Mission: Impossible franchise. Tom Harper was in negotiations to direct. Harper was confirmed in January 2021, with Netflix acquiring the distribution rights to the film. In February 2022, Jamie Dornan was cast to star alongside Gadot. In March, Alia Bhatt, Sophie Okonedo, Matthias Schweighöfer, Jing Lusi and Paul Ready were added to the cast.  This movie marks the Hollywood debut of Bollywood actress Alia Bhatt.

Principal photography began in the Alpin Arena Senales (South Tyrol) on 26 January 2022. Following in London, United Kingdom on 8 March 2022. The second schedule of filming then took place in Reykjavík, Iceland the following month, after which production moved back to London in May, for the succeeding schedule. The fourth schedule took place in Lisbon, Portugal. Principal filming concluded on 28 July 2022.

References

External links
 

2023 films
2023 action thriller films
Upcoming films
Upcoming Netflix original films
American action thriller films
American spy films
Films shot in Iceland
Films shot in the United Kingdom
Films directed by Tom Harper
Films produced by Bonnie Curtis
Skydance Media films
Films shot at Shepperton Studios
Films shot in Portugal